British Aerial Transport Company Limited (BAT) was a British aircraft manufacturer from its formation in 1917 to its closure in 1919.  The company was based at Willesden, London.

History
The company was formed in 1917 by Samuel Waring around the combined knowledge of Frederick Koolhoven as Chief Designer, and Robert Noorduyn as Chief Draughtsman.  Koolhoven's first design for the company was the F.K.22 fighter.  In 1919 Lord Waring reduced his aviation interests and this forced the closure of the company.  The fourth F.K.26 was the last aircraft built by the company.

Aircraft designs
BAT F.K.22  (1918) Single-engine single-seat fighter aircraft
BAT F.K.23 Bantam (1918) Single-engine single-seat fighter
BAT F.K.24 Baboon (1918) Single-engine biplane training aircraft
BAT Basilisk (F.K.25) (1918) Single-engined single-seat fighter aircraft
BAT F.K.26  (1919) Single-engine four-passenger biplane transport aircraft
BAT F.K.27  (1919) Two-seat single engine sporting biplane
BAT F.K.28 Crow (1920) Single-engine single-seat ultralight aircraft

References

 The Illustrated Encyclopedia of Aircraft (Part Work 1982-1985). London: Orbis Publishing. 
 Jackson, A.J. British Civil Aircraft Since 1919 Volume 1. London: Putnam, 1974. .

External links
  Koolhoven aircraft.

Defunct aircraft manufacturers of the United Kingdom
Vehicle manufacturing companies established in 1917
Vehicle manufacturing companies disestablished in 1919
1917 establishments in England
1919 disestablishments in England
British companies disestablished in 1919
British companies established in 1917